Spinning Dragons is a spinning roller coaster located at Worlds of Fun in Kansas City, Missouri, United States. Manufactured by Gerstlauer, it was the second ride of its kind in the world after the Fairly Odd Coaster at Mall of America's Nickelodeon Universe. The ride was built in the Orient area of the park in 2004 following the retirement of the Orient Express the previous year. The ride was installed by Ride Entertainment Group, who handles all of Gerstlauer's operations in the Western Hemisphere.

History
On October 29, 2003, Worlds of Fun announced that Orient Express would be removed. That same day, the park announced that a new spinning roller coaster named Spinning Dragons would be added to the park.

The ride was set to open on April 3, 2004, but the opening was delayed. Spinning Dragons officially opened two weeks later on April 17, 2004.

Seating arrangement and capacity

There are 6 cars. The riders are arranged 2 across in 2 rows, facing each other, for a total of 4 riders per car. Giving the ride a maximum capacity of 24 riders at a time. The ride has an estimated hourly operating capacity of 720 riders per hour. It is similar to Pandemonium at Six Flags theme parks and the Fairly Odd Coaster.

References

External links 

Spinning Dragons at Worlds of Fun's website
Spinning Dragons at the Roller Coaster DataBase

Roller coasters operated by Cedar Fair
Roller coasters in Missouri
Roller coasters introduced in 2004
Worlds of Fun